Clara Ward (17 June 1873 – 9 December 1916) was a wealthy American socialite who married Joseph, Prince de Caraman-Chimay of Belgium.

Early life
Clara Ward was born in Detroit, Michigan, the daughter of Captain Eber Brock Ward (1811–1875) and his second wife, Catherine Lyon, a niece of Senator Benjamin Wade. A wealthy man, often stated to be Michigan's first millionaire, E.B. Ward had holdings in Great Lakes steamships; lumbering at Ludington, Michigan; iron and steel manufacturing at Wyandotte, Michigan, Leland, Michigan, Milwaukee, Wisconsin, and Chicago, Illinois; and silver mining in Colorado. He manufactured the first Bessemer steel to be made in the United States at his plant in Wyandotte. Ward was president of the Flint and Pere Marquette Railroad from 1860 until his death on 2 January 1875 in Detroit. 

Captain Ward died when Clara was less than two years old. The mill and timber holdings at Ludington passed into the hands of Clara's mother and were managed by her brother, Thomas R. Lyon, as the firm of Thomas R. Lyon, Agent. As a child, Clara and her mother periodically visited Ludington to see their kin and inspect the mills.

First marriage

She came to the public's attention in 1889 or early 1890 when it was announced that a distinguished Belgian visitor to the United States, the Prince of Caraman-Chimay, a member of the Belgian Chamber of Deputies, had proposed marriage to a young, beautiful daughter of a wealthy family.

The title "Prince of Caraman-Chimay" possessed a long noble pedigree. This princely title was of the "foreign prince" type of the old French monarchy, in which "Prince" is a noble rank rather than a method showing the degree of relationship to the crown. The wife of that sort of prince becomes a "Princess", and so Clara became, entirely legitimately, a European princess. That her husband-to-be was more than twice her age and relatively poor seems to have been of minor consequence. They were married on 20 May 1890 in Paris. Clara was married at age 16, and her husband was 31.

Ward became "Princesse de Caraman-Chimay", though she was usually called "Clara, Princess of Chimay". Americans were ecstatic about their new princess. (The first American princess had been Catherine Willis Gray, great-grandniece of George Washington, who married a nephew of Emperor Napoleon, Prince Achille Murat of Naples, in 1826; Baltimore heiress Betsy Patterson had previously married Napoleon's brother Jérôme (later King of Westphalia) in 1803, but Napoleon annulled the marriage within a few years.) In 1891 she was the subject of a portrait by G.P.A. Healy, today in the collection of the Illinois State Museum in Springfield.

Two children shortly followed the marriage:
 Marie Elisabeth Catharine Anatole de Riquet, Comtesse de Caraman-Chimay (1891–1939)
 Marie Joseph Anatole Pierre Alphonse de Riquet, Prince de Caraman-Chimay (1894–1920)

There is evidence that she and the Prince favored the more prestigious Parisian restaurants with their patronage. Specifically, the great chef Escoffier named both Oeufs à la Chimay and Poularde Chimay after Princess Clara.

Second marriage

In early November 1896, the Prince and Princess Chimay were dining in Paris. Present at the same restaurant was a Hungarian, Rigó Jancsi ("Blackbird Johnny"), a Gypsy violinist. 

After a series of secret meetings, Ward and Rigó eloped in December 1896. To her family's consternation, the Ludington Record of 24 December 1896 carried news of the elopement with a woodcut illustration of Ward and the headline "Gone With a Gypsy". It was stated that Prince Joseph would institute divorce proceedings against his wife. Subsequent editions of the newspaper carried brief notices as to where Ward and Rigó had been reported seen during their trek across Europe to Hungary. A well-known cube-shaped chocolate sponge cake and chocolate cream pastry in Budapest was named Rigó Jancsi after the scandalous affair. The Prince and Princesse de Caraman-Chimay were divorced on 19 January 1897. The new couple married, likely in Hungary. Some accounts indicate that they soon moved to Egypt, where Clara taught her husband the intricacies of reading and writing.

Still called the Princess Chimay, Clara Ward soon found her resources dwindling. She was cut off from her first husband's finances. Although Ward was resourceful, her American family occasionally provided financial assistance.

She employed her beauty and celebrity to pose on various stages, including the Folies Bergère and likely the Moulin Rouge, while wearing form-fitting costumes. She called her art form poses plastiques. Henri de Toulouse-Lautrec made a scarce lithograph of her and Rigó in 1897 titled Idylle Princière. She was often photographed, and featured on many postcards during the Edwardian period, sometimes in a pose plastique and sometimes in a more or less conventional dress. Kaiser Wilhelm II is said to have forbidden the publication or display of her photograph in the German Empire because he thought her beauty "disturbing".

Later life
The income from this occupation may have been sufficient for the couple to live reasonably well. However, Rigó became unfaithful and they were divorced soon after their marriage. Her next romantic interest was Peppino Ricciardo, occasionally noted as Spanish, but likely Italian. It is believed he was a waiter she met on a train.

They married in 1904, but Peppino Ricciardo probably did not last long. The timing is vague, but Ward's next love, and her last husband, is thought to have been a station manager of the little Italian railroad that helped visitors tour Mount Vesuvius, a Signor Cassalota. Ward is believed to have still been married to her fourth husband when she died in Padua, Italy, on 9 December 1916, aged 43.

It was not until some three years after Ward's death that her first husband, Prince Joseph de Riquet of Chimay and Caraman, remarried to Anne Marie Charlotte Amélie Gilone Le Veneur de Tillières (1889–1962) on 24 June 1920.

Legacy
Marcel Proust was fond of Clara. Marthe Bibesco wrote in her memoir, Au Bal avec Marcel Proust, that her cousin, Antoine, who exchanged letters with Proust, received one in which he mentioned that he still felt fondly for Ward and continued to write to her. In fact, Proust based a character in À la recherche du temps perdu (English: "In Search of Lost Time") on Clara Ward: that of a cousin of the Baron Charlus. The major character of the Duchesse de Guermantes was chiefly based on Clara Ward's first sister-in-law, Elisabeth, who became the Comtesse de Greffulhe after her marriage.
The character of Simone Pistache in the film version of Cole Porter's musical Can-Can was based in part on Clara Ward. In the film, set in Paris in 1896, Shirley MacLaine as Pistache dances in a skin-tight, flesh-colored costume like that favored by Ward.

See also
 Rigo Jancsi Celebration Cake

References

General references
Cleveland Amory, Who Killed Society?, p. 234. New York: Harper & Brothers, 1960.
"Gone With a Gypsy", news dispatch in the Ludington Record, December 24, 1896.
Luman W. Goodenough, Lumber, Lath and Shingles, pp. 54–55. Detroit: Privately printed, 1954. Written by a childhood acquaintance of Ward's who died in 1947.
George W. Hotchkiss, History of the Lumber and Forest Industry of the Northwest, pp. 715–716. Chicago: George W. Hotchkiss & Company, 1898.
History of Manistee, Mason and Oceana Counties, Michigan, pp. 50–51. Chicago: H.R. Page & Co., 1882.
The National Cyclopedia of American Biography, Vol. XIII, p. 125. New York: James T. White & Company, 1906.
Cornelia Otis Skinner, Elegant Wits and Grand Horizontals, p. 220. Boston: Houghton Mifflin Company, 1962.
Charles Richard Tuttle, General History of the State of Michigan, pp. 157–159. Detroit: R.D.S. Tyler & Co., 1873.

External links

 
 The Chateau of Chimay and Hainaut, Belgium
 Toulouse-Lautrec's "Idylle Princière"

1873 births
1916 deaths
People from Detroit
American socialites
Belgian princesses
Princesses by marriage
American expatriates in Belgium
American dancers